The green moray (Gymnothorax funebris) is a moray eel of the family Muraenidae, found in the western Atlantic Ocean from Long Island, New York, Bermuda, and the northern Gulf of Mexico to Brazil, at depths down to .

The common name "green moray" is also sometimes used to refer to the yellow moray, G. prasinus.

References

External links 

 National Aquarium - Green Moray Eel Fact Sheet
 Florida Museum of Natural History - Green Moray Fact Sheet 
 

green moray
Fish of the Eastern United States
Fish of the Western Atlantic
Fish of the Dominican Republic
green moray